American rapper and songwriter Kendrick Lamar has appeared in 72 music videos, including 37 featured appearances and one uncredited appearance. He has also appeared in several television shows and films. Lamar has directed, written and executive produced a variety of his music videos with his creative partner Dave Free, who are collectively known as The Little Homies.

Music videos

As lead artist

As featured artist

Guest appearances

Production credits

Filmography

Film

Television

References

External links

Male actor filmographies
American filmographies
Director filmographies
Kendrick Lamar
Videographies of American artists